The following is a list of centroids of various two-dimensional and three-dimensional objects. The centroid of an object  in -dimensional space is the intersection of all hyperplanes that divide  into two parts of equal moment about the hyperplane. For an object of uniform composition, the centroid of a body is also its center of mass. In the case of two-dimensional objects shown below, the hyperplanes are simply lines.

2-D Centroids
For each two-dimensional shape below, the area and the centroid coordinates  are given:

Where the centroid coordinates are marked as zero, the coordinates are at the origin, and the equations to get those points are the lengths of the included axes divided by two, in order to reach the center which in these cases are the origin and thus zero.

3-D Centroids
For each three-dimensional body below, the volume and the centroid coordinates  are given:

See also

 List of moments of inertia
 List of second moments of area

References

External links
 http://www.engineering.com/Library/ArticlesPage/tabid/85/articleType/ArticleView/articleId/109/Centroids-of-Common-Shapes.aspx

Mechanics
Physics-related lists
Geometric centers